The National Institute for Automotive Service Excellence (ASE) is a professional certification group that certifies professionals and shops in the automotive repair and service industry in the United States and parts of Canada. It is an independent, non-profit organization created in 1972 in response to consumers  needing to distinguish between potentially incompetent and competent automotive technicians.  The organization aims to improve the quality of vehicle repair and service through the testing and certification of repair and service professionals.

ASE Certification
ASE offers certification tests for automotive professionals through Prometric Test Centers. These involve several exams, the passing of which, added with two years of relevant hands-on work experience, will merit certification. The required experience can be substituted by one year of on-the-job training and a two-year training degree.  A recertification track is also offered for those who have had previous certification. 
Upon certification, the certified applicant will also receive an ASE shoulder insignia, wallet I.D. card and a wall certificate suitable for framing.  As of January 2020 the wallet card is again available after being retired since June 2016.

ASE certification is usually required by employers for those interested in pursuing a career in professional automotive service. Some municipalities require ASE certification in order to be licensed for motor vehicle repairs, such as Broward and Miami-Dade counties of Florida.

See also
 Automobile repair shop
 Auto mechanic

References

External links
 
 Consumer Information

Automotive repair shops of the United States
Organizations established in 1972
Standards organizations in the United States
1972 establishments in Washington, D.C.
Organizations based in Virginia
Leesburg, Virginia